Abigail Pogrebin (born May 17, 1965) is an American writer, journalist, podcast host for Tablet magazine, and former Director of Jewish Outreach for the Michael Bloomberg 2020 presidential campaign.

Family and early life
Pogrebin was born in New York to a Jewish family, the daughter of an author and feminist activist Letty Cottin Pogrebin, the co-founder of Ms. magazine, and Bert Pogrebin, a management-side labor lawyer, and is the identical twin sister of New York Times journalist Robin Pogrebin. She graduated summa cum laude from Yale University.

Pogrebin married David Shapiro in 1993, and they have two children.

Career
After graduating from Yale in 1987, Pogrebin became a broadcast producer for Mike Wallace, Charlie Rose and associate producer for Ed Bradley at 60 Minutes and Bill Moyers at PBS and before that for The MacNeil/Lehrer Report and Fred W. Friendly. Afterwards she turned to freelance journalism and published articles in magazines and newspapers like Newsweek, New York Magazine, The Forward, Tablet, and The Daily Beast.

She has moderated conversations for The Jewish Community Center in Manhattan (JCC), the Streicker Center, UJA Federation, and the Shalom Hartman Institute.

Pogrebin is the author of My Jewish Year: 18 Holidays, One Wondering Jew, published in 2017, which was a finalist for the 2018 National Jewish Book Award, and the 2005 book Stars of David: Prominent Jews Talk About Being Jewish, for which she interviewed 62 famous American Jews — from Ruth Bader Ginsburg to Steven Spielberg — about their religious identity. Her second book, One and the Same: My Life As an Identical Twin and What I’ve Learned About Everyone’s Struggle to Be Singular, was published in October 2009. Her 2011 book Showstopper documents her time in the cast of Stephen Sondheim’s musical “Merrily We Roll Along,” and Pogrebin is featured in the 2016 Netflix documentary film by director Lonny Price, Best Worst Thing That Ever Could Have Happened.

She served as the president of New York's Central Synagogue from 2015-2018, and in November 2019 she joined former New York City mayor Michael Bloomberg’s presidential campaign as the Director of Jewish Outreach.

Tablet Magazine’s podcast, “Parsha in Progress” features a regular Torah discussion with Pogrebin and Rabbi Dov Linzer, who is the president of Yeshivat Chovevei Torah. Pogrebin moderated and wrote the Tablet Magazine series, “The Minyan,” which zeroes in on one aspect of Jewish life through the voices of those who live it. She has written about antisemitism in The Atlantic and the Jewish new year in Vogue.

Awards
Pogrebin received the “Impact Award” from the JCC in Manhattan, and the “Community Leader Award” from The Jewish Week in 2017. Her 2017 book My Jewish Year: 18 Holidays, One Wondering Jew was a finalist for the 2018 National Jewish Book Award. 

She received the second place award for the 2021 Excellence in Enterprise Religion Reporting from The Religion News Association and received an honorable mention in the category of Award for Excellence in Special Sections or Supplements from The Jewish Press Association’s Rockower Awards in 2021 for her series in The Forward, “Still Small Voice: 18 Questions about God,” which asked 18 clergy and scholars about their own faith.

Notes

External links
 Author's official Website
 NY Times Review of My Jewish Year
 Pogrebin, Abigail (2005-12-26). "Excerpt: 'Stars of David: Prominent Jews Talk About Being Jewish' by Abigail Pogrebin". ABC News.
 Audio Recording of Pogrebin's interviews at the 92nd St. Y
 Random House author page for Abigail Pogrebin
 YouTube video with Abigail Pogrebin discussing her book Stars of David
 WHAT EVERYONE'S TALKING ABOUT - playlist
 Abigail Pogrebin archive at New York Magazine
 Abigail Pogrebin archive at The Huffington Post
 Abigail Pogrebin appearances on "The Charlie Rose Show"
 "Why Is This Year Different From All Other Years?" The Atlantic
 "The Unexpected Power of a Virtual Jewish New Year" Vogue
 "A Talmudic Debate About Ramekins: Taking On My Parents’ Clutter" The Forward

21st-century American non-fiction writers
Living people
Yale University alumni
1965 births
American feminists
Jewish American writers
American twins
Jewish feminists
Feminist writers
20th-century American journalists
21st-century American journalists
Journalists from New York City
21st-century American Jews
60 Minutes producers